North Fremantle was an electoral district of the Legislative Assembly in the Australian state of Western Australia from 1890 to 1911.

Based in urban North Fremantle, the district was one of the original 30 seats contested at the 1890 election.

The Labour league candidates were not always successful in early elections.

The district ceased to exist at the 1911 election when it was amalgamated with the neighbouring district of East Fremantle into the new district of North-East Fremantle. Its member at the time, Harry Bolton of the Labor Party, transferred to the seat of South Fremantle.

Members

Election results

Notes

North Fremantle